Retd. Lt.Colonel Bharat Gurung had served as the Royal A.D.C. to Late Prince Dhirendra Shah of Nepal in the 1980s.

References

Living people
Year of birth missing (living people)
Gurung people